The 1st Army was an army-level command of the Russian Imperial Army created during World War I. The First Army, commanded by General Paul von Rennenkampf, invaded East Prussia at the outbreak of war in 1914 along with the Second Army commanded by General Alexander Samsonov. After declaring war on the German Empire, the Russian Empire had been able to mobilize very quickly.  All Russian forces were put under the command of Grand Duke Nikolai and his Quartermaster General Yuri Danilov.

The invading forces made a determined and speedy attack on East Prussia.  However, the First and Second Armies were stopped by the German Eighth Army, led by Field Marshal Paul von Hindenburg and his chief of staff, General Erich Ludendorff.  The German and Russian armies met at Tannenberg, where the Second Army was encircled and suffered complete destruction.  Both the First and Second Armies suffered terrible casualties in one of the most comprehensive German victories of World War I. The First Army also suffered defeat at the First Battle of the Masurian Lakes in September 1914, which led to Rennenkampf's dismissal and replacement by Litvinov. First Army served under Northwestern front for the remainder of the war. Litvinov was replaced by Sokovnin in April 1917. Vannovski replaced Sokovnin in July and the army's final commander, von Notbek, took over in September 1917.

Order of battle on formation 
The First Army consisted of the following units in August 1914:

Military Fronts in which the 1st Army participated
 Northwestern Front (July 1914 – August 1915)
 Western Front (August 1915 – April 1916)
 Northern Front (April 1916 – July 1917)
 Southwestern Front (July – September 1917)
 Northern Front (September 1917 – the beginning of 1918)

Engagements
 Battle of Stallupönen (17 August 1914)
 Battle of Gumbinnen (20 August 1914)
 Battle of Tannenberg (23–30 August 1914)
 First Battle of the Masurian Lakes (8–11 September 1914)
 Battle of Łódź (11 November – 6 December 1914)

Commanders
The 1st Army had the following commanders until it was demobilized in 1918.

See also
 List of Imperial Russian Army formations and units

References

Armies of the Russian Empire
Military units and formations established in 1914
1914 establishments in the Russian Empire
Military units and formations disestablished in 1918